Lionel Lukin (18 May 1742 – 16 February 1834) was a British inventor and lifeboat designer.

Bibliography
 Frederick Robus: Lionel Lukin of Dunmow: The Inventor of the Lifeboat. Robus Broth. 1925

Web 
 Life Boat (Made up in Britain)
 1785: The first lifeboats(Royal National Lifeboat Institution)

See also
 William Wouldhave
 Royal National Lifeboat Institution
 Grace Darling

References

1742 births
1834 deaths
English inventors
People from Great Dunmow
People from Hythe, Kent